Eileen Naughton was the star of Galway's All-Ireland final appearance against Dublin in 1962 and UCG's Ashbourne Cup win of 1968, she was short-listed for Cuchulainn all star awards in 1963 and 1964, despite missing part of the season through injury.

Career
A past pupil of Presentation Convent she won a schools county championship and five Connacht championship medals, he was a regular on the Galway team from the age of 15 and the Connacht inter-provincial team from the age of 16.

Her medical studies led to an extended Ashbourne Cup career with University College Galway. In 1963, the year she started her first year at college, she was already noted in the newspapers for her semi-final display, both in goal and outfield, against  UCC. In 1964 she kept QUB scoreless in the semi-final and confined UCC, who had scored 6–1 against UCD in the other semi-final to 0–1 in the final. She was selected for the combined universities, the equivalent of the Ashbourne Cup#Ashbourne All Stars for six successive years.

References

External links
 Camogie.ie Official Camogie Association Website
 Wikipedia List of Camogie players

Galway camogie players
Year of birth missing (living people)
Living people